Charles Thomson Ritchie, 1st Baron Ritchie of Dundee,  (19 November 1838 – 9 January 1906) was a British businessman and Conservative politician who sat in the House of Commons from 1874 until 1905 when he was raised to the peerage. He served as Home Secretary from 1900 to 1902 and as Chancellor of the Exchequer from 1902 to 1903.

Background and education
Ritchie was born at Dundee, Scotland, the third son of William Ritchie, of Rockhill near Broughty Ferry in Forfarshire, head of the firm of William Ritchie & Sons, of London and Dundee, East India merchants, jute spinners and manufacturers. The Ritchie family had long been connected with the town of Dundee. His elder brother James Thomson Ritchie was Lord Mayor of London from 1903 to 1904 and was created a Baronet in 1903 (a title which became extinct on his death). Ritchie was educated at the City of London School, after which he went into the family business.

He married Margaret Ower, daughter of Thomas Ower of Perth, on 7 December 1858.

Political career

In 1874 was returned to parliament as Conservative member for the Tower Hamlets. In 1885 he was made secretary to the Admiralty, and from 1886 to 1892 was President of the Local Government Board in Lord Salisbury's second administration, sitting as member for St George in the East. He was responsible for the Local Government Act 1888, instituting county councils; and a large section of the Conservative party always owed him a grudge for having originated the London County Council.

In Lord Salisbury's later ministries, as member for Croydon (1895–1906), he was President of the Board of Trade (1895–1900) and Home Secretary (1900–1902); and when Sir Michael Hicks-Beach retired in August 1902, he became Chancellor of the Exchequer in Balfour's cabinet. In his earlier years he had been a fair-trader and he was strongly opposed to Colonial Secretary Joseph Chamberlain's movement for a preferential tariff, leading to his sacking by Balfour in September 1903.
Ritchie's son in law, the Scottish architect Mervyn McCartney, built a country house for Ritchie, Welders House, in the Buckinghamshire village of Jordans.

On 22 December 1905, he was created a peer as Baron Ritchie of Dundee, of Welders in the Parish of Chalfont St Giles in the County of Buckingham. However, he was in ill-health, and died at Biarritz in January 1906. He is buried at Kensal Green Cemetery, London. He was succeeded in the title by his second but only surviving son, Charles.

Ritchie was elected as Rector of the University of Aberdeen in late October 1902, taking up the position the following month, serving for three years until November 1905.

Arms

Notes

References
  
Attribution:

External links

 
 

|-

1838 births
1906 deaths
Chancellors of the Exchequer of the United Kingdom
Secretaries of State for the Home Department
British Secretaries of State
Ritchie, Charles
Ritchie, Charles
Ritchie, Charles
Ritchie, Charles
Ritchie, Charles
Ritchie, Charles
Ritchie, Charles
UK MPs who were granted peerages
Politics of the London Borough of Croydon
People educated at the City of London School
Politicians from Dundee
Barons in the Peerage of the United Kingdom
Rectors of the University of Aberdeen
Members of the Privy Council of the United Kingdom
Progressive Party (London) politicians
Members of London County Council
Burials at Kensal Green Cemetery
People from Broughty Ferry
Presidents of the Board of Trade
Peers created by Edward VII